Destine was a Dutch rock band.

Destine may refer to:

 Destin Destine (born 1895), Haitian sport shooter
 Jean-Léon Destiné (1918–2013), Haitian-American dancer and choreographer
 Jean-Marc Destine (born 1973), Haitian runner

See also
 Destiny (disambiguation)